Botafogo is a beachfront neighborhood (bairro) in Rio de Janeiro, Brazil. The word may also refer to one of the following.

Football clubs
Botafogo de Futebol e Regatas, Brazilian football club based in Rio de Janeiro
Botafogo Futebol Clube (SP), Brazilian football club based in Ribeirão Preto, São Paulo
Botafogo Futebol Clube (PB), Brazilian football club based in João Pessoa, Paraíba
Associação Botafogo Futebol Clube, Brazilian football club based in Guará, Distrito Federal
Botafogo Esporte Clube, Brazilian football club based in Teresina, Piauí
Botafogo Sport Club, Brazilian football club based in Salvador, Bahia
Botafogo Futebol Clube de Jaguaré, Brazilian football club based in Jaguaré, Espírito Santo
Botafogo (Cape Verde), Cape Verdean football club

Other
Botafogo (dance move), a figure in Samba
Botafogo (galleon), a 16th-century Portugal warship
Botafogo (horse), an Argentinian racehorse
Fazenda Botafogo, Rio de Janeiro, a neighborhood in Rio de Janeiro, Brazil